C46 or C-46 may refer to:

Vehicles 
 Boeing KC-46 Pegasus, an American military tanker aircraft
 Curtiss C-46 Commando, an American transport aircraft 
 , a Fiji-class light cruiser of the Royal Navy

Other uses 
 An Act to amend the Criminal Code (offences relating to conveyances), Bill C-46 of the Parliament of Canada
 C46 road (Namibia)
 Caldwell 46, a variable nebula
 Escadrille C46, a squadron of the French Air Service
 Kaposi's sarcoma
 Three Knights Game, a chess opening
 C46, a 46 minute-long Compact Cassette